Carolyn Hoff Lynch (née Carolyn Ann Hoff; August 26, 1946 – October 1, 2015) was an American philanthropist and contract bridge multi-national and gold medal world champion.

Philanthropy
Lynch, along with her husband Peter, co-founded the Lynch Foundation in 1988, and served as its chairman and president. The Lynch Foundation, valued at $125 million, gave away $8 million in 2013 and has made $80 million in grants since its inception. The Foundation supports education, religious organizations, cultural and historic organizations, hospitals, and medical research.

The Lynches give money primarily in five ways: as individuals, through the Lynch Foundation, through a Fidelity Charitable Gift Fund, and through two charitable trusts.

The Lynches have made gifts as individuals, donating $10 million to Peter Lynch's alma mater, Boston College, naming the School of Education after the family.

Bridge accomplishments
Lynch was a Grand Life Master in the American Contract Bridge League and was a five-time national and a gold medal world champion.

Wins
 Keohane North American Swiss Teams (3) 2008, 2009, 2014
 Baze Senior Knockout Teams (1) 2009
 Roth Open Swiss Teams (1) 2013
 d’Orsi Senior Trophy (1) 2013

Runners-up
 Keohane North American Swiss Teams (1) 2006
 Roth Open Swiss Teams (1) 2012
 Baze Senior Knockout Teams (2) 2013, 2014

Personal life 
Carolyn married Peter Lynch on May 11, 1968 and moved to Marblehead in 1970. Together, they raised three daughters: Mary, Annie, and Elizabeth. Lynch died in October 2015 due to complications of leukemia at the age of 69.  The Nova documentary Black Hole Apocalypse (2018) that aired on January 10, 2018 was dedicated in her memory.

References

External links
 

1946 births
American contract bridge players
Wharton School of the University of Pennsylvania alumni
2015 deaths
20th-century American philanthropists